Jeff Maxwell (born Jeffrey Maxwell Knott) is an American film and television actor. He is perhaps best known for playing Pvt. Igor Straminsky, a recurring character in the television series M*A*S*H. He appeared in 83 episodes of the classic CBS comedy from 1973 to 1983, including the series finale Goodbye, Farewell and Amen, which aired February 28, 1983, and became the most-watched scripted broadcast in American history (a title it still holds) with over 121.6 million viewers and 50.1 million households tuning in.

Maxwell's film debut was in the acclaimed 1974 Mel Brooks comedy film Young Frankenstein. He played one of the title character's medical students. He was also featured in the 1977 sketch comedy film Kentucky Fried Movie in a solo scene titled "Feel-A-Round." The box-office success was directed by John Landis and written by Jim Abrahams, David Zucker and Jerry Zucker, who subsequently wrote the classic film comedy, Airplane!. His television roles include guest appearances on hit television series such as ABC's Eight is Enough, CBS's The Waltons and House Calls and NBC's CHiPs. He also hosted the short-lived game show Shopper's Casino in the 1987–88 season. In 1997, his cookbook, inspired by years of playing a mess hall cook on M*A*S*H, titled Secrets of the M*A*S*H Mess: The Lost Recipes of Private Igor, was published and he made an appearance on NBC's Today Show to promote it.

Maxwell is a regular participant on the alt.tv.mash newsgroup where, along with series writer Larry Gelbart (up until Gelbart's death in 2009), answers fan questions about the behind-the-scenes workings of M*A*S*H. Before he began his acting career on M*A*S*H, Maxwell was one-half of a comedy team called "Garrett & Maxwell." They performed at clubs throughout the United States for seven years before parting ways. Maxwell (according to journalist Peter Palmiere) has been working on a video documentary about female judges and referees in the sport of boxing. Since September 2018, Maxwell has hosted a podcast called MASH Matters, which celebrates the classic television series M*A*S*H. He is joined on the podcast by co-host Ryan Patrick.

References

External links

Living people
American male television actors
American male film actors
Year of birth missing (living people)
20th-century American male actors